Ray DiLauro (born July 13, 1979) is an American former professional ice hockey defenseman. He was selected by the Atlanta Thrashers in the 9th round (246th overall) of the 1999 NHL Entry Draft.

Career
After playing Youth Hockey for the Philadelphia Glaciers and Tier III Junior "A" Ice Hockey for the Philadelphia Little Flyers, DiLauro played High School Ice Hockey for the National Sports Academy in Lake Placid, New York.

DiLauro then attended St. Lawrence University where he played four seasons of NCAA Division I Ice Hockey with the Saint Lawrence Saints from 1998-2002.  While at St. Lawrence, DiLauro served as an Alternate Captain during the 2001-02 season, won the 2002 Pete McGeough Award as the team's outstanding Defenseman, and won both the 2000 ECAC Championship and the 2001 ECAC Championship.

During his Professional Ice Hockey career, DiLauro played in the American Hockey League with the Cleveland Barons, Wilkes-Barre Scranton Penguins, Springfield Falcons, Manchester Monarchs, and Binghamton Senators.  He also played in the ECHL for the Trenton Titans, Fresno Falcons, Wheeling Nailers, Columbus Cottonmouths, and Reading Royals.  In addition, he played in the Central Hockey League for the Missouri Mavericks, the German Deutsche Eishockey Liga for Füchse Duisburg and Krefeld Pinguine, the Austrian Hockey League for EHC Linz, the Italian Serie A for HC Bolzano, and in Asia League Ice Hockey for the Japanese club Nippon Paper Cranes.

For the 2013–14 season, DiLauro joined the Philadelphia Revolution Ice Hockey organization.  With the Revolution, he served as Head Coach of the organizations's U16 team which competed in the Eastern Junior Elite Prospects League, and also as a coach for the organization's Pee Wee team competing in the Full Check Hockey League.

Career statistics

Awards and honors

References

External links

1979 births
Living people
American men's ice hockey defensemen
Atlanta Thrashers draft picks
Binghamton Senators players
Bolzano HC players
Cleveland Barons (2001–2006) players
Columbus Cottonmouths (ECHL) players
EHC Black Wings Linz players
Füchse Duisburg players
Fresno Falcons players
Ice hockey players from Pennsylvania
Krefeld Pinguine players
Manchester Monarchs (AHL) players
Missouri Mavericks players
Nippon Paper Cranes players
Sportspeople from Bucks County, Pennsylvania
Reading Royals players
St. Lawrence Saints men's ice hockey players
Springfield Falcons players
Trenton Titans players
Wheeling Nailers players
Wilkes-Barre/Scranton Penguins players
People from Bensalem Township, Pennsylvania